Traian Stoianovich (20 July 1921 – December 21, 2005) was an American historian and a professor of history at Rutgers University. He specialized in the history of the Balkans.

Biography
Born Trajan Stojanović in Gradešnica, then part of the Kingdom of Serbs, Croats and Slovenes (now part of North Macedonia), his family moved to Rochester, New York, where he was brought up.  At a time when it was difficult for working-class people and immigrants to achieve higher education, he earned his undergraduate degree from the University of Rochester. After serving in the United States Army during World War II (1942–45), he took a master's degree at New York University and received a doctorate from Université de Paris in 1952, where he became a major figure in the internationally influential Annales School of history. His doctoral mentor was Fernand Braudel.

Stoianovich was for four decades a teacher of European and world history at Rutgers University. He has also taught at New York University, University of California, Berkeley, Stanford University, and Sir George Williams University (renamed Concordia University) in Montreal, Canada. He taught at the University of Thessaloniki, Greece, 1958-1959, on a Fulbright grant.

He applied his education to the study of the Balkans, publishing "A Study of Balkan Civilization" (1967) which is regarded as both a classic and a major educational text. After his retirement he published a four volume collection of articles and essays, "Between East and West, the Balkan and Mediterranean Worlds" (1992–1995) and also "Balkan Worlds: The First and Last Europe" (1994) rich in its insights and understanding for both the Balkans and European civilization. Many of his works were translated into Serbian and published in the former Yugoslavia, as well as other major languages.

Dr. Norman Markowitz, JRI Director, Professor of History, Rutgers University, remembers him well:

He was a member of the Jasenovac Research Institute's Advisory Board. He continued to work as a scholar right up to his death on December 21, 2005 in New Brunswick, New Jersey, after a long struggle with cancer.

Family 
Traian Stoianovich was married to French painter Marcelle Stoianovich, active mostly in Paris. His daughter Diana Stoianovich married in 1986 to Charles H. Revson Jr., heir of Charles Revson and they have two sons, Charles H. Revson III and Alexander Traian Revson. His son Christian Stoianovich is a screenwriter.

Main publications 
 The Pattern of Serbian Intellectual Evolution 1830-1880. 1959.
 Conquering Balkan Orthodox Merchant. 1960.
 A Study in Balkan Civilization. Knopf, 1963.
 French Historical Method. Cornell University Press, 1976.
 Between East and West: The Balkan and Mediterranean Worlds. 1992–1995, 4 volumes.
 Balkan Worlds: The First and Last Europe. Armonk, New York, and London, England: M.E. Sharpe, 1994.
 Introduction to The Balkans Since 1453, by Leften Stavros Stavrianos. New York: New York University Press, 2009.

References

Sources

External links
 

1920 births
2005 deaths
People from Novaci Municipality
Serbs of North Macedonia
20th-century American historians
American male non-fiction writers
Historians of the Balkans
Balkan studies
Rutgers University faculty
University of Rochester alumni
Yugoslav emigrants to the United States
New York University alumni
University of Paris alumni
Writers from New Brunswick, New Jersey
American people of Serbian descent
Historians from New Jersey
20th-century American male writers
American expatriates in France